Malta appeared in every edition of the quadrennial Mediterranean Games event ever since its establishment in 1951.

Overview

By event

See also
Malta at the Olympics
Malta at the Paralympics

External links
Medals table per country and per Games at the official International Committee of Mediterranean Games (CIJM) website